Commodity exchange may refer to:

 Commodities exchange, any exchange where various commodities and derivatives products are traded.
 Commodity markets, for the markets trading on commodities in general.

See also
 List of Commodity Exchanges
 New York Mercantile Exchange